CEDA is the Confederación Española de Derechas Autónomas, a 1930s Spanish political party.

CEDA may also refer to:

Organisations
 Committee for Economic Development of Australia, an Australian economic think-tank
 Cross Examination Debate Association, an intercollegiate debate association founded in the United States
 Centre for Environmental Data Analysis, a United Kingdom Government Organisation serving the data needs of the environmental science community
 IEEE Council on Electronic Design Automation, an organizational unit of the Institute of Electrical and Electronics Engineers
 Computer Entertainment Developers Association, a precursor to the International Game Developers Association

Other uses
 Civil Emergency and Defense Agency, a fictional government organization in the 2008 computer game Left 4 Dead